The Curse of Eve is a lost 1917 silent film drama directed by Frank Beal and starring Enid Markey and Edward Coxen. It is also known under its alternate title Mother, I Need You.

Production
As with its proclamation in press material, the film was considered daring from the start because of its theme. The Garden of Eve sequence was shot in the Santa Cruz Islands southern California. Released on State Rights basis it was heavily re-edited or censored in some jurisdictions because Markey's character has an abortion.

Cast
Enid Markey - Eva Stanley
Edward Coxen - John Gilbert
Jack Standing - Leo Spencer
Eugenie Besserer - The Mother
William Quinn - Dr. Burton
G. Raymond Nye - Attorney
Clarissa Selwynne - Marie
Elsie Greeson - 
Marion Warner -
Arthur Allardt - 
Grace Thompson -

References

External links
 The Curse of Eve at IMDb.com

 lantern slide

1917 films
Lost American films
American silent feature films
American black-and-white films
Silent American drama films
1917 drama films
1917 lost films
Lost drama films
1910s American films
1910s English-language films